Barbara Law, née Dixon (born April 4, 1952) is an Irish-Canadian actress and singer. First prominent in Ireland with the pop trio Maxi, Dick and Twink and Brendan Bowyer's Royal Showband, she moved to Canada in the early 1970s after marrying Peter Law of The Pacific Showband. While the Pacific Showband continued to record and perform in its own right under the new name Dublin Corporation, Peter and Barbara Law also performed separately as co-vocalists for the band Sweet Chariot.

In 1978, Law and Grant Smith performed the opening number at the Juno Awards of 1978, a dance routine set to the song "Step Out" from the film Outrageous!. Later the same year, she appeared alongside Taborah Johnson, Louis Negin, Richard Adams and Liliane Stillwell in Bananas, a musical revue at Toronto's Bayview Theatre which was directed by Jack Creley. In 1979, she appeared in Allan Guttman's cabaret show Tonight at 8:30...9 O'Clock in Newfoundland.

She released the disco album Take All of Me on Pavilion Records in 1979, scoring a minor dance club hit with the album's title track. Produced by Harry Hinde and Paul Sabu, the album included backing vocals by Cissy Houston.

In the 1980s she worked as an actress, most prominently in the films The Surrogate and Bedroom Eyes, and received a Genie Award nomination for Best Supporting Actress for the latter film. In 1984, she portrayed Katharine Hepburn in Cliff Jones's Howard Hughes musical For the Love of Howard, opposite Ross Petty as Hughes.

She also had guest roles in the television film The Popcorn Man, the television series Adderly, Night Heat, Diamonds, Katts and Dog, Counterstrike and Due South, and a minor role in the film The Planet of Junior Brown.

References

External links

1952 births
Living people
Irish pop singers
Irish women singers
Irish film actresses
Irish television actresses
Irish musical theatre actresses
Irish emigrants to Canada
Canadian women pop singers
20th-century Canadian women singers
Canadian film actresses
Canadian television actresses
Canadian musical theatre actresses
Actresses from Toronto
Musicians from Toronto
20th-century Canadian actresses